PTSD, or postraumatic stress disorder, is a mental disorder that can develop after a person is exposed to a traumatic event.

PTSD may also refer to:

Healthcare
Acute stress reaction, short term condition which may develop into PTSD
Complex post-traumatic stress disorder (C-PTSD)

Music
PTSD (Pharoahe Monch album) or PTSD: Post-Traumatic Stress Disorder, 2014
PTSD (G Herbo album) and its title track, 2020
PTSD, an album by L.S. Underground, 2010
"PTSD", a song by Dreamville and Omen featuring Mereba, Deante' Hitchcock and St. Beauty from Revenge of the Dreamers III
"PTSD", a song by the American rapper Pop Smoke from the mixtape Meet the Woo

Writing
Post-Traumatic, a 2022 novel by Chantal V. Johnson.

See also
Post Traumatic, an album by Mike Shinoda, 2018